Richard Foote Acworth (born 19 October 1936) is a British Church of England priest, most notably Archdeacon of Wells from 1993 to 2003.

Acworth was educated at St John's School, Leatherhead; Sidney Sussex College, Cambridge and Ripon College Cuddesdon. After National Service in the RNVR he was ordained deacon in 1963, and priest in 1964. He served curacies in Fulham, Langley and Bridgwater. He was Vicar of Yatton from 1969 to 1981; Priest in charge of St John Taunton from 1981 to 1985; and Vicar of St Mary Magdalene, Taunton from 1985 to 1993.

Publications

Creation, Evolution and the Christian Faith (1969)

References

1936 births
Archdeacons of Wells
Living people
People educated at St John's School, Leatherhead
Alumni of Sidney Sussex College, Cambridge
Alumni of Ripon College Cuddesdon
Royal Naval Volunteer Reserve personnel

20th-century Anglican theologians
21st-century Anglican theologians